Turmoil in the Swaths is a novel by the French writer Boris Vian. It was published posthumously by La Jeune Parque in 1966.

See also
 1966 in literature
 20th-century French literature

References

1966 French novels
Novels by Boris Vian
Novels published posthumously
French detective novels